Władysław Kazimierz Broniewski (17 December 1897, Płock – 10 February 1962, Warsaw) was a Polish poet, writer, translator and soldier. Known for his revolutionary and patriotic writings.

Life

He was the son of Antoni, a bank clerk. As a young man, Broniewski joined in 1915 the legions of Józef Piłsudski. As a member of the 1st Legions Infantry Regiment, he participated in the Polish–Soviet War and in 1920 fought in the Battle of Białystok. He was decorated for bravery with the order of Virtuti Militari.

Broniewski developed leftist sympathies and by the late 1920s he was a revolutionary poet. In summer 1931, he was arrested during a literary meeting of writers connected with the Communist Party of Poland (KPP) along with Jan Hempel and Aleksander Wat. He was helped by Bolesław Wieniawa-Długoszowski.

When Poland was attacked in 1939 by Germany, he wrote an important poem encouraging Poles to put away political differences and fight the aggressors. After Poland was invaded by the Soviet Union, Broniewski found himself in Soviet-occupied Lwów. His poems were printed in a Soviet-published newspaper, but he was soon arrested by the NKVD on trumped-up charges of "hooliganism". He refused to co-operate with the NKVD and after four months was transported to the Lubianka prison in Moscow, where he stayed for  thirteen months.  Afterwards, he worked at the Polish embassy in Kuybyshev. He left the Soviet Union with the Polish army led by General Władysław Anders and through Iran came to Iraq and then Palestine.

After World War II and the establishment of the Polish People's Republic, he compromised by writing in 1951 a poem Słowo o Stalinie ('A Word about Stalin'). Subsequently, Broniewski became an important political figure and was proclaimed a foremost national poet by the authorities. He still managed to preserve a certain degree of independence, and some of his poems from this period are a testimony to his talent. He had also been an accomplished translator of poetry and prose, translating, among others, Fyodor Dostoevsky, Sergei Yesenin, Vladimir Mayakovsky, and Bertolt Brecht.

During the last years of Broniewski's life, his health had been ruined by alcohol abuse. He died in Warsaw.

Poetry

Broniewski's poetry deals with problems of human life in the context of historical events, such as wars and revolutions (for example, the Paris Commune), and with questions of justice, fight for freedom, patriotism and personal suffering. This last aspect is evident in the cycle Anka, dedicated to the memory of tragically deceased poet's daughter Anna, who was gas-poisoned on 1 September 1954 (often compared to Jan Kochanowski's Laments). Another important Broniewski's poem is Ballady i romanse, alluding to the title of Adam Mickiewicz's collection. Ballady i romanse is about the Holocaust. Its hero is a thirteen years old Jewish girl Ryfka, who dies together with Jesus Christ shot by the Nazis. Broniewski was conservative regarding poetic form. He used classical forms of verse, traditional metres and stanzas. He often employed the dactylic metre.

Poetry collections
 Wiatraki (1925)
 Dymy nad miastem (1927)
 Troska i pieśń (1932)
 Krzyk ostateczny (1938)
 Bagnet na broń (1943)
 Drzewo rozpaczające (1945)
 Nadzieja (1951)
 Anka (1956)

Notes

Honours and awards
 Order of the Builders of People's Poland (1955)
 Silver Cross of the Order of Virtuti Militari
 Commander's Cross with Star of the Order of Polonia Restituta

Further reading
 Broniewski, Władysław. Pamiętnik 1918–1922. Warszawa: Państwowy Instytut Wydawniczy, 1987.

External links 

 Władysław Broniewski at Culture.pl

1897 births
1962 deaths
Writers from Płock
Polish people of the Polish–Soviet War
Recipients of the Silver Cross of the Virtuti Militari
Recipients of the Order of Polonia Restituta (1944–1989)
Commanders with Star of the Order of Polonia Restituta
Recipients of the Order of the Builders of People's Poland
Polish deportees to Soviet Union
Polish people detained by the NKVD
20th-century Polish poets
Recipients of the State Award Badge (Poland)